Mahlon Fay Perkins  (23 November 1882 – 1963) was a United States diplomat. After serving in China for many years, he was consul-general in Barcelona during the Spanish Civil War. It was his intervention which saved the lives of Charles Orr and Lois Orr after they had been arrested in the Stalinist crackdown on the Workers' Party of Marxist Unification (POUM). He visited them several times when they were in captivity, securing their release on 1 July 1937, and placing them on a ship bound for Marseilles on 3 July.

Perkins, born in North Adams, Massachusetts, graduated from Harvard Universityin 1904. He was U.S. Vice Consul in Chefoo, 1911–12; Shanghai, 1915–17; U.S. Consul in Changsha, 1918–20; Tientsin, 1926–27.

In 1978, his son, also named Mahlon F. Perkins (1918–2011), who was born in Shanghai, featured in a scandal  that rocked the New York legal profession. The younger Perkins, then a partner in the law firm of Donovan, Leisure, Newton & Irvine, who was representing Kodak, admitted lying in an antitrust case brought against the company. He was sentenced to a month in prison and subsequently became a civil liberties lawyer, volunteering with the Center for Constitutional Rights for over 11 years.

References

1882 births
1963 deaths
American diplomats
Harvard University alumni
American expatriates in China
American expatriates in Spain